"Cheveux longs et idées courtes" (translated title: Long hairs and short ideas) is a song by French singer Johnny Hallyday. It was released in 1966.

History

The song was a diss track directed at the singer Antoine, who had criticized Johnny Halliday in the lyrics of Élucubrations d'Antoine as a hasbeen artist. In Cheveux Longs et Idées Courtes, Halliday mocks Antoine's status as a pacifist, idealistic protest singer as being fake and naïve.

Commercial performance 
The song spent five consecutive weeks at no. 1 on the singles sales chart in France (from 14 May to 17 June 1966).

Charts

References 

1966 songs
1966 singles
Johnny Hallyday songs
French songs
Diss tracks
Songs about musicians
Cultural depictions of pop musicians
Cultural depictions of French men
Philips Records singles
Number-one singles in France
Songs written by Gilles Thibaut